Nogometni klub Rače, commonly referred to as NK Rače, is a Slovenian football club which plays in the town of Rače. The club was founded in 1946. NK Rače competes in the Slovenian Third League, the third highest league in Slovenia.

Honours
Slovenian Fourth Division
 Winners: 2021–22

Slovenian Fifth Division
 Winners: 2016–17

References

External links
NK Rače at MNZ Maribor

Association football clubs established in 1946
Football clubs in Slovenia
1946 establishments in Slovenia